Germany and Luxembourg first established bilateral relations in April 1951. The two countries have shared a peaceful and friendly relationship over their  year relationship, especially through their mutual cooperation in international organisations such as the European Union, NATO, the OECD and the United Nations.

Both countries have embassies to each other, with Germany's embassy in Luxembourg City, Luxembourg's embassy in Berlin, along with ten honorary consulates. As of October 2022, Germany's ambassador to Luxembourg is Dr. Heinrich Kreft, and Luxembourg's ambassador to Germany is Jean-Paul Senninger. 

The two countries share a  land border, with Luxembourg mostly bordering the German state of Rhineland-Palatinate, as well as a small  border with the state of Saarland.

History 
Luxembourg was a member of the Holy Roman Empire, the German Confederation and German Customs Union. From 1914 to 1918, German troops occupied Luxembourg during the First World War. During this time, the First German Embassy in Luxembourg was used as the Grand Headquarters, which led to disgruntlement.

During World War II, the Wehrmacht invaded Luxembourg on the night of May 9–10, 1940, to attack France and held the country until 1944. The Grand Duchess Charlotte fled with her family and government into exile. From May 1940, the Volksdeutsche movement in Luxembourg was convinced that Luxembourgers belonged to the "Germanic race" (Volksdeutsche) and, during the occupation of Luxembourg in World War II, tried to achieve annexation to the National Socialist German Reich. In August 1942, Germany annexed the occupied country until the Liberation of Luxembourg in 1944. 

After the war, diplomatic relation were reestablished in 1951. Both countries became trusted neighbors and became founding members of the European Coal and Steel Community and advocates of European Integration. The French Lorraine, the German Saarland and the Grand Duchy of Luxembourg today cooperate closely across borders in various areas within the framework of the Saar-Lor-Lux European Region.

Economic relations 
Germany is Luxembourg's most important economic partner, accounting for 27% of its foreign trade volume. Around 50,000 Germans work in Luxembourg.

Diplomatic missions 
Both countries have diplomatic missions to each other. Germany has an embassy in Luxembourg City, and Luxembourg has an embassy in Berlin, along with honorary consulates in Bad Hombourg, Bremen, Dresden, Düsseldorf, Hamburg, Hanover, Munich, Saarbrücken, Stuttgart and Trier.

See also 

 Foreign relations of Germany
 Foreign relations of Luxembourg

References 

 
Luxembourg
Bilateral relations of Luxembourg

Bilateral relations of Germany